Erik C. Peterson (born March 8, 1966) is an American Republican Party politician who serves in the New Jersey General Assembly representing the 23rd Legislative District. Peterson, who previously served on the Hunterdon County Board of Chosen Freeholders, replaced Assemblyman Michael J. Doherty, who was elected to the New Jersey Senate. He was sworn in on December 7, 2009, to fill Doherty's vacant Assembly seat.

Early life 
Peterson was born and raised in Cherry Hill, New Jersey where he graduated from Cherry Hill High School East. He attended North Carolina State University and earned a bachelor’s degree in business management in 1988. In 1990, he moved in Hunterdon County to work for the Beneficial Management Corporation. Recruited for the Accelerated Management Program at that company, he eventually ran the New Jersey operations of Beneficial's mortgage banking subsidiary. He then attended Temple University School of Law, graduating in 1996. That same year he was admitted to the bar in both New Jersey and Pennsylvania. After practicing law at various firms from 1998 until 2004, Peterson now has his own law office in Readington, specializing in real estate law, estate law, and business law. He currently resides in Franklin Township with his wife Jenni and their four children. He is a member of the Hunterdon County Chamber of Commerce and the local Lions Club. He is on the board of the local United Way. Peterson’s career in politics began with his appointment as a Republican County Committeeman for Lambertville, where he then resided. Peterson spent several years on the County Committee, only recently leaving that position. Peterson is also a former president of the Hunterdon County Young Republicans. Peterson was elected a Hunterdon County freeholder in 2005, running on a platform of fiscal conservatism, farmland preservation, and open government.

New Jersey Assembly 
Before being selected as Assemblyman in December 2009, Peterson ran in a special convention to replace Assemblywoman Marcia A. Karrow who had been appointed to the State Senate. In the first ballot taken of Republican committee persons of the 23rd district, Warren County Freeholder John DiMaio received 129 votes (short of a majority), Peterson 104, and fellow Hunterdon County Freeholder Matt Holt 56. In the second ballot, DiMaio defeated Peterson 153–141. In 2009, Republican Assemblyman Michael J. Doherty declined to seek re-election to his Assembly seat and instead challenged State Senator Marcia A. Karrow in the Republican primary for the special election in the 23rd district. Incumbent DiMaio, Peterson, and Doherty’s chief of staff, Edward Smith, ran for the Republican nomination to the Assembly seats. DiMaio received the most votes in the June 2009 Republican primary election, 11,888 votes (34.2% of the total vote) while Peterson narrowly defeated Smith by 52 votes: 11,439–11,387 (33.0% to 32.8%). DiMaio and Peterson won easily in the heavily Republican 23rd district in November's general election. As Doherty was sworn in as State Senator on November 23, 2009, a convention of Republican county committee members gathered to name a successor for the vacancy. Peterson was selected by the county committee members on December 6, 2009 and sworn into office the following day.

Committees 
Health and Senior Services
Judiciary
Law and Public Safety

District 23 

Each of the forty districts in the New Jersey Legislature has one representative in the New Jersey Senate and two members in the New Jersey General Assembly. The other representatives from the 23rd District for the 218th Legislature are:
Senator Michael J. Doherty (R)
Assemblyman John DiMaio (R)
Assemblyman Erik Peterson (R)

Electoral history

New Jersey Assembly

References

External links
Assemblyman Erik Peterson's legislative web page, New Jersey Legislature
Erik Peterson’s Law Office

1966 births
Living people
Candidates in the 2022 United States House of Representatives elections
Cherry Hill High School East alumni
County commissioners in New Jersey
New Jersey lawyers
Republican Party members of the New Jersey General Assembly
North Carolina State University alumni
People from Cherry Hill, New Jersey
People from Franklin Township, Hunterdon County, New Jersey
People from Lambertville, New Jersey
Politicians from Camden County, New Jersey
Temple University Beasley School of Law alumni
21st-century American politicians